Megan S. Fahlenbock  (born June 30, 1971) is a Canadian actress. She has worked in animation and also had a few film roles. She is best known for her voice roles as Gwen on Total Drama, Jen Masterson on 6teen, and Eva Kant in Diabolik.

Filmography

Film

Television

Video games

References

External links 

1971 births
20th-century Canadian actresses
21st-century Canadian actresses
Actresses from Toronto
Canadian film actresses
Canadian television actresses
Canadian video game actresses
Canadian voice actresses
Canadian water skiers
Canadian women anthropologists
Life coaches
Living people
McGill University alumni